Mathias Jack (born 15 February 1969) is a German football manager and former player who played primarily as a defender.

Playing career
Born in Leipzig, Jack began his career with Wismut Aue before moving to VfB Oldenburg in 1991. Following two years with them, Jack had a similar length of spell with Rot-Weiss Essen. Jack played for Essen in the 1994 German Cup Final. He then had spells with VfL Bochum and Fortuna Düsseldorf.

Jack moved to Scottish side Hibernian in 1999, going on to make over 100 appearances for the Easter Road side. He played for Hibs in the 2001 Scottish Cup Final, a 3–0 defeat by Celtic. Following his departure in the summer of 2003, Jack had a short spell with Raith Rovers in November before returning to his hometown with Sachsen Leipzig. In 2005, Jack moved abroad again to Icelandic side Grindavik before returning to Germany in 2006 with SV Meppen.

Jack joined DJK Amisia Rheine in January 2008, initially signing a contract until the end of the season.

Coaching career
Jack was Taşkın Aksoy's assistant manager at Fortuna Düsseldorf II. He became caretaker manager of the side when Aksoy became caretaker manager of the club's first team.

Career statistics

References

External links
 

Living people
1969 births
People from Bezirk Leipzig
German footballers
East German footballers
Footballers from Leipzig
Association football defenders
Bundesliga players
2. Bundesliga players
Scottish Premier League players
Scottish Football League players
FC Erzgebirge Aue players
VfB Oldenburg players
VfL Bochum players
Rot-Weiss Essen players
Fortuna Düsseldorf players
FC Sachsen Leipzig players
SV Meppen players
Hibernian F.C. players
Mathias Jack
Raith Rovers F.C. players
German expatriate footballers
German expatriate sportspeople in Scotland
Expatriate footballers in Scotland
German expatriate sportspeople in Iceland
Expatriate footballers in Iceland